Nebraska's 2nd congressional district is a congressional district in the U.S. state of Nebraska that encompasses the core of the Omaha–Council Bluffs metropolitan area. It includes all of Douglas County, which includes Omaha, as well as the suburban areas of the western part of Sarpy County. It has been represented in the United States House of Representatives since 2017 by Don Bacon, a member of the Republican Party. It was one of 18 districts that voted for Joe Biden in the 2020 presidential election while being won or held by a Republican in 2022.

History 
This district is known as a swing district; it was one of two districts with a margin of less than 5% in all elections held after the 2010 census. It has also backed the electoral winner of many presidential elections since 2000, except for when it voted for the losing candidate Mitt Romney over Barack Obama in 2012. In 2011, Nebraska lawmakers changed the district to excise Offutt Air Force Base and the city of Bellevue — an area with a large minority population — and moved the borders to include the Republican-heavy Omaha suburbs in western Sarpy County. The move was expected to dilute the city's urban Democratic vote, which Democrats criticized for gerrymandering.

In 2021, Republicans proposed a new map for the district, which encompasses southern Douglas County, Sarpy, and Saunders Counties. Another map backed by Democrats would keep Douglas County whole but move Bellevue, in Sarpy County, back into the 2nd district, where it was located prior to the state legislature's 2011 redistricting. The Democratic plan would also remove suburban areas of the 2nd district that lean Republican. The Republican congressional redistricting plan passed the committee 5-4 on a party-line vote but was stopped by a filibuster 29-17 on September 17. The legislature ultimately passed a compromise map instead.

Demographics 
According to the APM Research Lab's Voter Profile Tools (featuring the U.S. Census Bureau's 2019 American Community Survey), the district contained about 473,000 potential voters (citizens, age 18+). Of these, 80% are White, 9% Black, and 6% Latino. Immigrants make up 5% of the district's potential voters. Median income among households (with one or more potential voter) in the district is about $73,400, while 8% of households live below the poverty line. As for the educational attainment of potential voters in the district, 40% hold a bachelor's or higher degree.

Election results from statewide races

Nebraska and Maine are the only two states in the United States which distribute their electoral votes for president based on presidential candidates' performance in their respective congressional districts in addition to their statewide performance. The statewide popular vote winner for president receives two electoral votes, and the winner of each of Nebraska's congressional districts—there are currently three such districts—receives an electoral vote from the respective district.

While the rest of the state's electorate tends to be solidly Republican, the 2nd district is much more closely divided between the two main parties—Republican and Democratic. In the 2008 United States presidential election, Democratic presidential candidate Barack Obama targeted the district as a strategy of breaking a potential electoral-vote tie. He won the district's electoral vote by a margin of 3,325 votes over his chief general election opponent, Republican John McCain. However, McCain won Nebraska's statewide popular vote, as well as the district-wide popular vote for the other two Nebraska congressional districts, thus receiving four electoral votes from Nebraska. Obama's victory in the 2nd district meant that Nebraska's electoral delegation was split for the first time ever. It also marked the first Nebraskan electoral vote for a Democrat since 1964. By contrast, in 2012 and 2016, Republican presidential nominees Mitt Romney and Donald Trump won the 2nd district, as well as the overall statewide vote and the electoral votes of the first and third districts. The district flipped back to the Democratic Party in 2020, giving its one electoral vote to Joe Biden.

List of members representing the district

Election history

2006

2008

2010

2012

2014

2016

2018

2020

2022

Historical district boundaries

See also

 Nebraska's congressional districts
 List of United States congressional districts

References

 
 
 Congressional Biographical Directory of the United States 1774–present

External links
 Rep. Don Bacon's official House of Representatives website

02
1883 establishments in Nebraska